Pamela Conti (born 4 April 1982) is an Italian football manager and former player who coaches the Venezuela women's national team. As a player she was an attacking midfielder or striker for clubs in Serie A, Spain, Russia, the United States and Sweden, as well as for the Italy national team. She won two Italian Leagues, four Italian Cups, one Spanish Cup and one Russian League, and she represented Italy at two European Championships.

Career
Born in Palermo on 4 April 1982, she started her career in 1996 at Aquile Palermo. Despite playing in the third-tier, in May 1998 she made her debut for the Italian national team against Finland in the 1999 World Cup qualifying at 16 years old. The next year Conti signed for Serie A runners-up Torres CF, where she played for the next 10 years, winning two championships and four national cups, making her UEFA Women's Cup debut, and scoring 95 goals in 185 games in Serie A. In 2005, she made her debut at an international final tournament in the 2005 European Championship, where Italy was knocked out in the group stage.

In 2008 Conti moved to Spanish league champion Levante UD to again play the UEFA Women's Cup. Following the end of the season and playing the 2009 European Championship and the 2009 W-League with Buffalo Flash in the summer, she moved to national cup champion RCD Espanyol. Despite scoring 26 goals and winning the cup in her only season in Espanyol she returned to a declining Levante for the 2010-11 season.

In 2011, she signed for Russian Championship's runner-up Energiya Voronezh. However, after Energiya was knocked out of the UEFA Champions League's Round of 16 she moved to Zorky Krasnogorsk, where she played for two seasons. There she won the championship and again played the Champions League. On the other hand, she wasn't called up for the 2013 European Championship. She completed her international career with 90 caps and 30 goals.

In 2013, she returned to Torres CF, now a national powerhouse, after five years abroad. It proved to be a turbulent period for the Sardinian giants and Conti left for Swedish club Eskilstuna United DFF. But she retired from playing after making just two appearances for Eskilstuna, returning to Sicily and setting up a football school for youngsters.

Conti was hired as an under-16 coach by Atlético Madrid in summer 2018. In October 2019 she was appointed head coach of the Venezuela women's national football team. She aimed to guide the team to its first ever FIFA Women's World Cup qualification.

National Team
On 2 October 2010, she scored against Ukraine for the FIFA Women's World Cup qualification at the Stadion Yuri Gagarin in Chernihiv.

Personal life
Conti's father Francesco Conti was a footballer for Palermo and died in 2018. Her brothers Vincenzo and Daniele were also professional footballers who developed in the youth system at Palermo.

Honours
Torres Calcio
 Serie A: 1999–00, 2000–01
 Italian Women's Cup: 1999–00, 2000–01, 2003–04, 2004–05, 2007–08
 Italian Women's Super Cup: 2000, 2004
 Italy Women's Cup: 2004, 2008

References

Italian women's footballers
Italy women's international footballers
1982 births
Living people
Expatriate women's footballers in Spain
Italian expatriate sportspeople in Spain
Expatriate women's soccer players in the United States
Italian expatriate sportspeople in the United States
Expatriate women's footballers in Russia
Footballers from Palermo
Primera División (women) players
RCD Espanyol Femenino players
Levante UD Femenino players
Serie A (women's football) players
Torres Calcio Femminile players
USL W-League (1995–2015) players
Italian expatriate sportspeople in Russia
FC Energy Voronezh players
FC Zorky Krasnogorsk (women) players
Women's association football forwards
Damallsvenskan players
Female association football managers
Eskilstuna United DFF players
Expatriate women's footballers in Sweden
Italian expatriate sportspeople in Sweden
Italian expatriate sportspeople in Venezuela
Venezuela women's national football team managers
Expatriate football managers in Venezuela
Italian football managers
Italian expatriate football managers